Jackie Pirico is a Canadian stand-up comedian. Her comedy album Splash Pad received a Juno Award nomination for Comedy Album of the Year at the Juno Awards of 2023.

She has also had acting roles in the comedy-drama film Sundowners, the web series True Dating Stories and the television series Children Ruin Everything, and appeared in two episodes in the second season of Roast Battle Canada against Daniel Woodrow and Nick Nemeroff.

References

External links

21st-century Canadian comedians
Canadian women comedians
Canadian stand-up comedians
Living people
Year of birth missing (living people)